Mongi Soussi Zarrouki (24 February 1936 – 26 May 2000) was a Tunisian track and field athlete. He competed in the 400 metres hurdles events at the 1960 Summer Olympics. He was also the silver medallist in the event at the 1959 Mediterranean Games.

See also
 Tunisia at the 1959 Mediterranean Games

References

External links
 

1936 births
2000 deaths
People from Kasserine Governorate
Tunisian male hurdlers
Olympic athletes of Tunisia
Athletes (track and field) at the 1960 Summer Olympics
Mediterranean Games silver medalists for Tunisia
Mediterranean Games medalists in athletics
Athletes (track and field) at the 1959 Mediterranean Games
20th-century Tunisian people